Pšenična Polica is a settlement in the Municipality of Cerklje na Gorenjskem in the Upper Carniola region of Slovenia.

References

External links

Pšenična Polica on Geopedia

Populated places in the Municipality of Cerklje na Gorenjskem